Auguste "Gust" Hellemans (21 June 1907 in Kapelle-op-den-Bos, Belgium – 4 May 1992 in Berchem-Sainte-Agathe, Belgium), was a Belgian footballer.

Biography 
He played as a midfielder for KV Mechelen and Belgium. He was part of Belgium's team at the 1928 Summer Olympics, but he did not play in any matches. He also played in the World Cups of 1930 in Uruguay and 1934 in Italy. He finished his career in 1947, at RAA Louviéroise. After the war, he coached for a number of seasons at K. Patro Eisden Maasmechelen.

Honours 
 International from 1928 to 1934 (28 caps)
 Participation at the Olympic Games in 1928 (1 match)
 Participation at the World Cups of 1930 (2 matches) and 1934 (1 match)
 Belgian D2 Champions in 1928 with KV Mechelen
 Top goalscorer in Belgian D2 in 1933

References

External links
 

Belgian footballers
Belgium international footballers
1930 FIFA World Cup players
1934 FIFA World Cup players
K.V. Mechelen players
R.A.A. Louviéroise players
Belgian football managers
K. Patro Eisden Maasmechelen managers
1907 births
1992 deaths
Footballers at the 1928 Summer Olympics
Association football midfielders
Olympic footballers of Belgium